Naum Semyonovich Shusterman (18 August 1912 – 25 April 1976) was a lieutenant colonel of the Soviet Union, who served as the chief engineer of the 43rd Soviet Fighter Aviation Regiment during the Great Patriotic War.

Biography

Early life
Shusterman was born on 18 August 1912, in Kiev, then Russian Empire, to parents Shendlya and Simeon Shusterman. He had four sisters.

Military service

At the age of 18, Shusterman attended the Military Aviation Engineering Academy of Leningrad. He remained there for three years, and learned numerous technicalities of military aircraft.
In 1932, Shusterman enlisted in the 16th Aviation Army of the USSR, where he served as an engineer of the 3rd rank.

Great Patriotic War

During the Winter War and the Great Patriotic War, Shusterman served as a captain and later as a major, holding the position of Chief Engineer of the 43rd Soviet Fighter Aviation Regiment.
Serving all over the Eastern Front, he participated in the defense of Kiev, Stalingrad and Leningrad, in the liberation of Warsaw and in the capture of Berlin.
Shusterman became one of the few people who fought in the war from beginning to end.

Later service and discharge
In 1949, Shusterman was promoted to the rank of lieutenant colonel. He continued to serve as Chief Engineer until his discharge.
Shusterman, aged 42, was honorably discharged from the Soviet Army in 1954 on account of illness. His discharge conditions gave him rights to wear his military uniform.

Death
Even though Shusterman attended the 30th Anniversary of Victory celebrations in Moscow in 1975, his health slowly began to deteriorate. He was admitted to the Kiev Military Hospital in February 1976, where he spent the final three months of his life.
On 25 April 1976, Shusterman died of lung cancer. He was aged 63.

Personal life
Shusterman married Elizabeth Chernyak in 1934, and in 1936, they had their first son, Alexander. In 1937, Chernyak gave birth to twins, Arnold and Mikhail.

Awards and decorations

Shusterman received seven Orders, seven campaign medals, three service medals and six jubilee medals during his military career and personal life. In 1939, he received his first Order of the Red Star. He received an Order of Lenin in 1941, and another Order of the Red Star in 1942-1943. He was also awarded the Order of the Patriotic War twice (one of each class), and received an Order of the Red Banner towards the end of the war. 
Shusterman received medals for his participation in the defence of Stalingrad, Kiev and the Caucasus, in the liberation of Warsaw and in the Capture of Berlin. He was also awarded the Medal for Battle Merit and the Medal for Victory.

List
 Order of Lenin
 Order of the Red Banner
 Order of the Red Star (three times)
 Order of the Patriotic War, 1st class
 Order of the Patriotic War, 2nd class
 Medal for Battle Merit
 Medal "For the Defence of Stalingrad"
 Medal "For the Defence of the Caucasus"
 Medal "For the Defence of Kiev"
 Medal "For the Capture of Berlin"
 Medal "For the Liberation of Warsaw"
 Medal "For the Victory over Germany in the Great Patriotic War 1941–1945"
Medal "For Impeccable Service", 1st class
Medal "For Impeccable Service", 2nd class
Medal "For Impeccable Service", 3rd class
 Jubilee Medal "30 Years of the Soviet Army and Navy"
 Jubilee Medal "40 Years of the Armed Forces of the USSR"
 Jubilee Medal "50 Years of the Armed Forces of the USSR"
 Jubilee Medal "Twenty Years of Victory in the Great Patriotic War 1941-1945"
 Jubilee Medal "Thirty Years of Victory in the Great Patriotic War 1941-1945"
 Jubilee medal "For Military Valour in Commemoration of the 100th Anniversary since the Birth of Vladimir Il'ich Lenin"

References

Soviet military personnel of World War II
Soviet World War II pilots
Soviet engineers
Soviet Jews in the military
1912 births
1976 deaths
Recipients of the Order of Lenin
Recipients of the Order of the Red Banner